Television Malta (TVM) is a terrestrial television network in Malta operated by the national broadcaster, Public Broadcasting Services. Alongside the main TVM network, PBS operates a sister channel TVMNews+ (formerly TVM 2).

History

TVM was launched on 29 September 1962 as the first television service in Malta, although television broadcasts from neighbouring Sicily in far-southern Italy could be received in Malta from as early as 1957.

In October 2011, PBS announced another overhaul of the TVM brand, to mark 50 years since the establishment of the Malta Television Service in 2012. The new branding pays homage to previous TVM identities, and makes use of the Maltese cross, which features heavily in the 2010's L-Aħbarijiet title sequence.

In March 2012, PBS started its trial transmissions on the new sister channel TVM2, which replaced Education 22 (E22). The broadcast time starts at around the morning (for TVM) and finishes at around 12:00am. In 2021, PBS started transmissions on the channel TVMNews+ which has replaced TVM2.

Programming
TVM broadcasts a mix of news, sport, entertainment, magazine programming and children's programmes. It is funded through a government grant and commercial advertising. The majority of programmes broadcast on TVM are produced externally of PBS. PBS publishes details of the types of programmes it wishes to broadcast on TVM and production companies provide PBS with a detailed report of their proposal for the programme.

Most programmes are broadcast in Maltese, however the Maltese speak both Maltese and English so English also features, mainly in BBC and ITV titles. Sunday evenings are dedicated to classic British comedy, and English language films are shown on Saturday evenings. The English language feed of Euronews is also broadcast daily.

A new programme schedule was announced, including an increased number of news bulletins and a new current affairs-led breakfast show. For several years including the 2015/2016 period TVM had the highest number of viewers compared to the rest of Maltese television stations put together. Some of the current hits are Xarabank, Disset, Strada Stretta, Skjetti and news broadcasting. Statistics show that more than a quarter of the population of Malta watch these on a regular basis.

News
News programming on TVM is the only major network television news not produced by a political party's media apparatus, as the two other major Maltese networks (One and NET Television) are owned by the Labour and Nationalist parties respectively.

TVM airs TVAM, a breakfast television program focused on news and current affairs, weekday mornings from 07:00 to 08:30. TVM's main newscast L-aħbarijiet ta' Televixin Malta ("The News of Television Malta") is aired weeknights from 20:00 to 20:50, along with short news updates titled Aħbarijiet fil-qosor ("News in Brief") throughout the day. Since 2012, a nightly newscast in Maltese Sign Language has aired on sister network TVM2.

TVM previously carried bulletins in English from Euronews and Britain's ITN.

TVM HD

On 8 March 2012, PBS also started trials of TVM HD, the first HD channel from Malta. The channel is available to all those who have Melita Netbox or iBox and can be found on channel 110. GO, Melita's main rival in the cable television industry on the Maltese Islands included the channel later in their schedule and also exclusively TVM2 HD.

References

External links 
  
About TVM

Television stations in Malta
Television channels and stations established in 1962
1962 establishments in Malta